Woodridge Ecological Reserve is an ecological reserve located  west of Woodridge in the Rural Municipality of Piney, Manitoba, Canada.

References

External links
 iNaturalist: Woodridge Ecological Reserve

Protected areas established in 2015
Ecological reserves of Manitoba
Nature reserves in Manitoba
Protected areas of Manitoba